Parmena subpubescens is a species of beetle in the family Cerambycidae. It was described by Hellrigl in 1971. It is known from Sardinia, Italy, and Sicily.

References

Parmenini
Beetles described in 1971